Mads Würtz Schmidt (born 31 March 1994) is a Danish racing cyclist, who currently rides for UCI WorldTeam . He rode at the 2013 UCI Road World Championships. In May 2018, he was named in the startlist for the 2018 Giro d'Italia. In July 2019, he was named in the startlist for the 2019 Tour de France. In June 2021, he won the Danish National Road Race Championships.

Major results

2011
 1st  Time trial, UCI Junior Road World Championships
 2nd Time trial, National Junior Road Championships
2012
 1st  Overall Driedaagse van Axel
1st Stages 2 (ITT) & 4
 1st Paris–Roubaix Juniors
 1st Stage 2a (ITT) Course de la Paix Juniors
 8th Time trial, UCI Junior Road World Championships
 8th Time trial, UEC European Junior Road Championships
2013
 1st  Young rider classification, Le Triptyque des Monts et Châteaux
 7th Ster van Zwolle
2014
 2nd ZLM Tour
 4th Rund um den Finanzplatz Eschborn-Frankfurt
 5th Ster van Zwolle
2015
 1st  Time trial, UCI Under-23 Road World Championships
 1st  Time trial, National Under-23 Road Championships
 1st Stage 4 Tour de l'Avenir
 3rd Time trial, National Road Championships
 6th Overall ZLM Tour
1st Stage 2 (TTT)
 7th Overall Danmark Rundt
1st  Young rider classification
1st Stage 5 (ITT)
 8th Velothon Stockholm
 9th Ringerike GP
2016
 National Under-23 Road Championships
1st  Road race
1st  Time trial
 1st  Overall Le Triptyque des Monts et Châteaux
1st  Points classification
1st Stages 2 & 3b
 1st GP Herning
 3rd Overall Danmark Rundt
1st  Young rider classification
1st Stage 4 (ITT)
 3rd Skive–Løbet
 9th Overall ZLM Tour
 9th Overall Boucles de la Mayenne
2017
 2nd Rund um Köln
 3rd Overall Étoile de Bessèges
1st  Young rider classification
2018
 7th Clásica de Almería
2019
 3rd Overall ZLM Tour
2020
 5th Coppa Sabatini
2021
 1st  Road race, National Road Championships
 1st Stage 6 Tirreno–Adriatico
 4th Trofeo Serra de Tramuntana
 5th Overall Étoile de Bessèges

Grand Tour general classification results timeline

References

External links
 

1994 births
Living people
Danish male cyclists
People from Randers
Sportspeople from the Central Denmark Region